Lorenz-Günther Köstner (born 30 January 1952) is a retired German footballer who is now a football manager who last managed Fortuna Düsseldorf. Following the sacking of Armin Veh on 25 January 2010, he was named interim manager of VfL Wolfsburg until 30 June 2010.

Coaching career

Early career
Between July 1982 and June 1990, Köstner was head coach of Bayern Hof, Reutlingen 05, SC Freiburg, and Hessen Kassel. Then Köstner became assistant coach with VfB Stuttgart.

Rot-Weiss Essen
Köstner was head coach of Rot-Weiss Essen between November 2006 and May 2007.

VfL Wolfsburg
Köstner had three spells as head coach of VfL Wolfsburg. The first spell happened between December 2008 and January 2010, the second spell happened between July 2010 and October 2012, and the final stint happened between December 2012 and June 2013. In between the stints, Köstner was head coach on two occasions. In the first occasion, Köstner replaced Armin Veh and was named interim head coach until the end of the season on 25 January 2010. Steve McClaren eventually replace Veh as head coach. For the second stint, Köstner became interim head coach when Wolfsburg sacked Felix Magath on 25 October 2012. Dieter Hecking eventually replaced Magath. Köstner then continued in his role as the reserve team head coach until June 2013. Valérien Ismaël replaced Köstner as the reserve team head coach.

Fortuna Düsseldorf
Köstner became manager of Fortuna Düsseldorf on 30 December 2013.

Managerial statistics

References

1952 births
Living people
German football managers
Bundesliga players
2. Bundesliga players
KFC Uerdingen 05 players
Borussia Mönchengladbach players
Arminia Bielefeld players
SC Freiburg managers
Stuttgarter Kickers managers
SpVgg Unterhaching managers
1. FC Köln managers
Karlsruher SC managers
TSG 1899 Hoffenheim managers
VfL Wolfsburg managers
KSV Hessen Kassel managers
Rot-Weiss Essen managers
Fortuna Düsseldorf managers
Association football midfielders
German footballers
West German footballers
West German football managers